Isaac Adamson, born in Fort Collins, Colorado in 1971, is the American author of a series of mystery novels set in Japan and featuring journalist and amateur detective Billy Chaka.

Biography
After graduating from Rocky Mountain High School in Fort Collins, Adamson attended UCLA briefly before graduating from the University of Colorado at Boulder with a degree in Film Studies. While at UCLA, he was a member of the 1990 NCAA National Championship team.

Adamson's first novel, Tokyo Suckerpunch, was to be made into a film by Sony Pictures Entertainment, starring Tobey Maguire in the role of Billy Chaka. All four of his Billy Chaka novels were published by HarperCollins. They are currently out of print. His novel Complication was published by Counterpoint Press. Complication, a thriller set in Prague, was a nominee for the Mystery Writers of America's 2013 Edgar Awards in the Best Paperback Original category.

Adamson currently lives in Portland, Oregon. He is married to Chee-Soo Kim.

Written works
 Tokyo Suckerpunch (2000)
 Hokkaido Popsicle (2002)
 Dreaming Pachinko (2003)
 Kinki Lullaby (2004)
 Complication (2012)
 Bubbles (script)

References

External links

1971 births
Living people
American mystery novelists
Writers from Fort Collins, Colorado
Novelists from Colorado
American male novelists
University of Colorado Boulder alumni
21st-century American novelists
21st-century American male writers
UCLA Bruins men's soccer players